Traudl Schubert (born 25 September 1957) is a German gymnast. She competed in six events at the 1976 Summer Olympics.

References

External links
 

1957 births
Living people
German female artistic gymnasts
Olympic gymnasts of West Germany
Gymnasts at the 1976 Summer Olympics
People from Weilheim-Schongau
Sportspeople from Upper Bavaria